The Croatan were a small Native American ethnic group living in the coastal areas of what is now North Carolina. They might have been a branch of the larger Roanoke people or allied with them. 

The Croatan lived in current Dare County, an area encompassing the Alligator River, Croatan Sound, Roanoke Island, Ocracoke Island, and parts of the Outer Banks, including Hatteras Island. The Croatan people who exist today live in Cumberland, Sampson, and Harnett counties predominantly.

The chiefs, called werowances ("he who is rich"), controlled from 1 to 18 towns. The greatest were able to muster 700 or 800 fighting men. Chiefs and their families were held in great status and with respect, but they were not all powerful. In order for any particular direction from leadership to be followed through, chiefs had first to convince their followers that said course of action or cause was wise/in the tribe's best interest. The role of the chief was to spread the wealth to his tribe, and, if unable to do so, the same level of respect was no longer conferred to the chief in command. 

Phillip W. Evans, a linguist, suggested the word Croatan means "council town" or "talk town," which likely indicates the residence of an important leader and a place where councils were held.

Beliefs 
According to Thomas Harriot, the Native Americans living in coastal North Carolina believed there was "one only chief and great God, which has been from all eternity" and made petty gods, "to be used in the creation and government to follow." They believed in the immortality of the soul. Upon death, the soul either enters heaven to live with the gods or goes to a place near the setting sun called Popogusso, to burn for eternity in a huge pit of fire. The concept of heaven and hell was used on the common people to respect leaders and live a life that would be beneficial to them in the afterlife. Conjurors and priests were distinctive spiritual leaders. Priests were chosen for their knowledge and wisdom and were leaders of the organized religion. Conjurors, on the other hand, were chosen for their magical abilities. Conjurors were thought to have powers from a personal connection with a supernatural being (mostly spirits from the animal world).

European colonization 
It is known that the arrival of English Settlers upset some pre-existing tribal relationships. The Algonquian people advocated cooperation while others (the Yamasee, Cherokee and Chickasaw, for example) resisted. Later, this conflict between tribes and settlers would lead to the Yamasee War. Tribes that maintained mutually beneficial contact with the settlers gained power through their access to and control of European trade goods. While the English may have held great military superiority over the Carolina Algonquians, the Native Americans' control over food and natural resources was a much more decisive factor in the conflict with early settlers. Despite the varying relationships among tribes, the Roanoke and Croatan were believed to have been on very good terms with English Settlers of the Roanoke Colony. Wanchese, the last leader of the Roanoke, accompanied the English on a trip to England.

The Lost Colony 

Some of the survivors of the Lost Colony of Roanoke may have joined the Croatan. Governor White finally reached Roanoke Island on August 18, 1590, three years after he had last seen them there, but he found his colony had been long deserted. The buildings had collapsed and "the houses [were] taken down." The few clues about the colonists' whereabouts included the letters "CROATOAN" carved into a tree. Croatoan was the name of a nearby island (likely modern-day Hatteras Island) in addition to the local tribe of Native Americans. Roanoke Island was not originally the planned location for the colony and the idea of moving elsewhere had been discussed. Before the Governor's departure, he and the colonists had agreed that a message would be carved into a tree if they had moved and would include an image of a Maltese Cross if the decision was made by force. White found no such cross and was hopeful that his family was still alive.

The Croatan, like other Carolina Algonquians, suffered from epidemics of infectious disease such as smallpox in 1598. These greatly reduced the tribe's numbers and left them subject to colonial pressure. They are believed to have become extinct as a tribe by the early seventeenth century.

Speculation of the fate of the "Lost Colony" 
Based on legend, some people said that the Lumbee tribe, based in North Carolina, were descendants of the Croatan and survivors of the Lost Colony of Roanoke Island. For over a hundred years, historians and other scholars have been examining the question of Lumbee origin. Although there have been many explanations and conjectures, two theories persist. In 1885, Hamilton McMillan, a local historian and state legislator, proposed the "Lost Colony" theory. Based upon oral tradition among the Lumbees and what he deemed as strong circumstantial evidence, McMillan posited a connection between the Lumbees and the early English colonists who settled on Roanoke Island in 1587 and the Algonquian tribes (Croatan included) who inhabited coastal North Carolina at the same time. According to historical accounts, the colonists mysteriously disappeared soon after they settled, leaving little evidence of their destination or fate. McMillan's hypothesis, which was also supported by the historian Stephen Weeks, contends that the colonists migrated with the Indians toward the interior of North Carolina's and by 1650 had settled along the banks of the Lumber River. It is suggested the present-day Lumbees are the descendants of these two groups.

Other scholars believe the Lumbees to be descended from an eastern Siouan group called the Cheraws. During the seventeenth and eighteenth centuries, several Siouan-speaking tribes occupied southeastern North Carolina. John R. Swanton, a pioneering ethnologist at the Smithsonian Institution, wrote in 1938 that the Lumbees were probably of Cheraw descent, but were also genealogically influenced by other Siouan tribes in the area. Contemporary historians such as James Merrell and William Sturtevant confirm this theory by suggesting that the Cheraws, along with survivors of other tribes whose populations had been devastated by warfare and disease, found refuge from both aggressive settlers and hostile tribes in the Robeson County swamps in eastern North Carolina.

In 1914, when Special Indian Agent O.M. McPherson was reporting on the rights of various Indian groups, he published a list of names of the Lost Colony. Numerous names on the list were typical Indian names in the North Carolina counties of Robeson and Sampson, at the time of his report. Many of the surnames included were that of surviving Croatan Indians. Late twentieth-century research has demonstrated that among surnames established as Lumbee ancestors were numerous mixed-race African Americans free in Virginia before the American Revolution and their descendants who migrated to Virginia and North Carolina frontiers in the late eighteenth and early nineteenth centuries.  These "free people of color" were mostly descendants of European men and African women who worked and lived together in colonial Virginia.  These connections have been traced for numerous individuals and families through court records, land deeds, and other existing historical documents. In Robeson County, they may have intermarried with Native American survivors and acculturated as Native Americans.

Research 
The Lost Colony Center for Science and Research has excavated English artifacts within the territory of the former Croatan tribe. The artifacts may also be evidence of trade with the tribe or of natives finding them at the former colony site.  The Center is conducting a DNA study to try to determine if there are European lines among Croatan descendants.

Researchers from the University of Bristol, UK, have also been excavating on Hatteras Island in conjunction with the Croatoan Archaeological Society. Hatteras Island is the main locus for the settlement of the Croatoan tribe and to date, they have discovered a large contact/pre-contact period settlement, midden deposits, and European trade items.

19th century 
Historian Malinda Maynor (Lumbee) wrote that, in 1890, a group of about 100 people who identified as Croatan descendants, or Lumbees, left Robeson County, North Carolina, for southern Georgia. By building a church and a school for their people outside of the influence of publicly-funded or pre-existing buildings in the area, they established an identity for themselves that subverted the racial barriers of the time which, prior to 1890, had operated under a very clear distinction between "black" and "white." This group, instead, considered themselves to be "Indians." They headed back to Bulloch County where they could keep their people together as "Indians." They used the segregation of Jim Crow South to develop themselves as an entire community. In 1910, the North Carolina state legislature renamed the Croatan Indians in North Carolina to "Cherokee."

A historical marker placed by the state of Georgia states: "In 1870 a group of Croatan Indians migrated from their homes in Robeson County North Carolina, following the turpentine industry to southeast Georgia. Eventually many of the Croatans became tenant farmers for the Adabelle Trading Company, growing cotton and tobacco. The Croatan community established the Mt. Zion Baptist Church in Adabelle, as well as a school and a nearby cemetery. After the collapse of the Adabelle Trading Company, the Croatans faced both economic hardship and social injustice. As a result, most members of the community returned to North Carolina by 1920."

State-recognized tribes 
The North Carolina state legislature recognized the Croatan Indians of Robeson County and the Croatan Indians of Sampson County in 1911. They were also granted the right of "Indians and their descendants shall have separate school for their children, school committees of their own race, and shall also have the right to choose their own teachers based upon the general assembly of North Carolina.  Today, these two groups are state-recognized tribes, known as the Lumbee Tribe of North Carolina and the Coharie Intra-tribal Council, Inc., respectively.

Unrecognized groups 
The Croatan Indian Tribe of South Carolina, an unrecognized organization, claims to descend from Croatan people.

Notable people 
 Manteo disappeared after 1587, ambassador and mediator.

See also
Algonquian languages
Algonquian peoples
Aquascogoc
Dasamongueponke
Hatteras Indians
 Pamlico
Roanoke people
Secotan

Notes

References
 K.I. Blu: "Lumbee", Handbook of North American Indians, vol. 14: 278-295, Washington, DC: Smithsonian Institution, 2004
 T. Hariot, J. White, J. Lawson: A vocabulary of Roanoke, vol. 13, Merchantville: Evolution Publishing,  1999
 Th. Ross: American Indians in North Carolina, South Pines, NC: Karo Hollow Press, 1999
 G.M. Sider: Lumbee Indian histories, vol. 2, Cambridge: Cambridge University Press, 1993
 S.B. Weeks: The lost colony of Roanoke, its fate and survival, New York: Knickerbocker Press, 1891
 J.R. Swanton: "Probable Identity of the Croatan Indians." U.S. Dept. of the Interior, Office of Indian Affairs, 1933
 J. Henderson: "The Croatan Indians of Robeson County, North Carolina", U.S. Dept. of the Interior, Office of Indian Affairs, 1923
K.O. Kupperman: "Roanoke, the Abandoned Colony", Rowman and Littlefield, 1984

Indigenous peoples of the Southeastern Woodlands
Algonquian peoples
Native American history of North Carolina
Native American tribes in North Carolina
Algonquian ethnonyms